Out Through the In Door is the eighth album by Vanilla Fudge, released in June 2007, with the US finally following in August 2009. According to the band's official webpage, it originally was to be released in February 2007. The following statement was taken from their website:
Coming in February, 2007... A New Album!

It's true! Mark, Vince, Tim, and Carmine were in California in July recording an album of Led Zeppelin covers. Mark said, "Basically, we rearranged some songs — we're doing a lot of their stuff Vanilla Fudge style. Some of the arrangements are slowed down, and some speeded up but I think we've done the songs justice."

The album title is a play on words of the 1979 Led Zeppelin album In Through the Out Door.

Track listing
"Immigrant Song" (Jimmy Page, Robert Plant)
"Ramble On" (Page, Plant)
"Trampled Under Foot"* (John Paul Jones, Page, Plant)
"Dazed and Confused" (Page)
"Black Mountain Side" (Page)
"Fool in the Rain" (Jones, Page, Plant)
"Babe I'm Gonna Leave You" (Anne Bredon)
"Dancing Days"* (Page, Plant)
"Moby Dick" (John Bonham, Jones, Page)
"All My Love" (Jones, Plant)
"Rock and Roll"** (Bonham, Jones, Page, Plant)
"Your Time Is Gonna Come" (Jones, Plant)

Personnel
Vanilla Fudge
Carmine Appice – drums, vocals, lead vocals (*)
Tim Bogert – bass guitar, vocals
Vince Martell – guitar, vocals, lead vocals (**)
Mark Stein – lead vocals, keyboards

Additional personnel
Teddy (Zig Zag) Andreadis – backing vocals
Tom Vitorino – backing vocals, vocal production, outside inspiration
Chris Morrison – recording engineer
Pat Regan and Carmine Appice – mixing
Brad Vance at Red Mastering – mastering
Vince Wasilewski – recording engineer (lead vocals on "Immigrant Song" and "Ramble On" at Otherworld Studios – Fort Lauderdale, FL)
Chuck Wright – layout, design

References

2007 albums
Led Zeppelin tribute albums
Vanilla Fudge albums